Hydro Dynamics is the name of the 2017/18 FIRST Lego League challenge. It focuses on the water cycle and the ways in which humans can influence it. Each event consists of two main portions: the project and robot gameplay. Teams have fewer than ten weeks to prepare for their competitions.

Project
Teams are invited to identify a problem in the human water cycle and examine it to determine the cause and current solutions that may exist. Teams then solve to the problem by improving on a previous solution or creating a new one. Teams finally create a presentation that describes their solution and how they reached it and present it to the judges at their competitions.

Gameplay
The table performance portion of Hydro Dynamics is played on a 4 ft by 8 ft field covered in a plastic covering and rimmed by wooden boards. In order to compete in this portion, teams have to build a robot using a Lego Mindstorms robotics kit. During a competition, two fields are placed besides each other, with one robot competing on each field. Matches last  minutes and consist of a team's robot completing missions using pre-programmed instructions.

Missions
The missions in Hydro Dynamics revolve around the purification, transportation, and use of water. A list of the missions and their point values is found below.
Pipe removal - 20 points
Flow - 25 points
Pump Addition - 20 points
Rain - 20 points
Filter - 30 points
Water Treatment - 20 points
Fountain - 20 points
2 Manhole Covers - 15 points each, 30 point bonus
Tripod -  Partially 15 points, completely 30 points
Pipe Replacement - 20 points
Pipe Construction - Partially 15 points, completely 30 points
Sludge - 30 points
Flower - 30 points, 30 point bonus
Water Well - Partially 15 points, completely 25 points
Firetruck - 25 points
Water Collection - At least one Rain 10 points, Big Water 10 points each, 30 point bonus
Slingshot - 20 points, 15 point bonus
Faucet - 25 points

See also
No Limits (FIRST)
Ocean Odyssey (FIRST)
Smart Move (FIRST)

References

External links
FLL 2017/18 Hydro Dynamics

Lego
FIRST Lego League games